You Write the Songs is an American music competition series that aired in syndication from 1986 to 1987 for a total of 26 episodes. The show featured amateur songwriters competing to have one of their songs recorded.

Format
Each week three amateur songwriters had their original song performed by the shows regular singers, all of whom were alumni of Star Search, the songs were then judged by a rotating celebrity panel with the winners advancing toward a $100,000 grand prize.

The winning song was "Everybody Needs a Dream" which was written by Tom Grose and performed on the series by Star Search Season 1 Male Vocalist grand champion Sam Harris. Grose had also previously competed on Star Search with his group The Varsity.

Among the celebrities who appeared as judges were Smokey Robinson, Whitney Houston, Melissa Manchester, and Neil Sedaka.

References

1986 American television series debuts
1987 American television series endings
First-run syndicated television programs in the United States
Song contests
English-language television shows